Callochromis macrops is a species cichlid endemic to Lake Tanganyika where it is found over sandy bottoms. This species reaches a length of  TL.  This species can also be found in the aquarium trade. It is the type species of the genus Callochromis.

References

macrops
Taxa named by George Albert Boulenger
Taxonomy articles created by Polbot
Fish described in 1898